The 2016 Leeds City Council election took place on Thursday 5 May 2016 to elect members of Leeds City Council in England. It was on the same day as other local elections.

As per the election cycle, one third of the council's seats were up for election. The councillors subsequently elected replaced those elected when their individual seats were previously contested in 2012.

The Labour Party retained all 21 of their contested council seats, maintaining their majority control of the council with a total of 63 of the 99 elected councillors. It was the second election in a row in which no party gained or lost any seats.

Election summary

This result had the following consequences for the total number of seats on the council after the elections:

Councillors who did not stand for re-election

Incumbent Labour councillors, Debra Coupar (Cross Gates & Whinmoor), Roger Harington (Gipton & Harehills) and Janette Walker (Headingley), all stood for new wards. Coupar was elected to represent Temple Newsam and Walker replaced Coupar as a councillor for Cross Gates & Whinmoor. Harington lost to the Liberal Democrats in Weetwood.

Ward results

References

2016 English local elections
2016
2010s in Leeds